Charles Harvey (1879 – after 1908) was an English footballer who played in the Football League for Small Heath, which was renamed Birmingham during his time at the club.

Born in the Small Heath district of Birmingham, Harvey was a sergeant in the Army stationed at Lichfield when Small Heath signed him. He made his debut in the First Division on 25 March 1905, deputising for Charlie Tickle at outside right in a home game against Sunderland which finished as a 1–1 draw, and played once more for the first team, two years later, before moving into Non-League football with Leek and then with Shrewsbury Town.

Notes

References

1879 births
Year of death missing
People from Small Heath, Birmingham
Footballers from Birmingham, West Midlands
English footballers
Association football wingers
Birmingham City F.C. players
Leek F.C. players
Shrewsbury Town F.C. players
English Football League players
British Army soldiers
Date of birth missing
Place of death missing
20th-century British Army personnel